Sir Bernard Walter Silverman,  (born 22 February 1952) is a British statistician and former Anglican clergyman. He was Master of St Peter's College, Oxford, from 1 October 2003 to 31 December 2009. He is a member of the Statistics Department at Oxford University, and has also been attached to the Wellcome Trust Centre for Human Genetics, the Smith School of Enterprise and the Environment, and the Oxford-Man Institute of Quantitative Finance. He has been a member of the Council of Oxford University and of the Council of the Royal Society. He was briefly president of the Royal Statistical Society in January 2010, a position from which he stood down upon announcement of his appointment as Chief Scientific Advisor to the Home Office. He was awarded a Knighthood in the 2018 New Years Honours List, "For public service and services to Science".

Education
Silverman was educated at the City of London School, an independent day school in Central London, from 1961 to 1969, on a Carpenter Scholarship (similar to today's full bursary), followed by Jesus College at the University of Cambridge.

Career

 1970–73 Undergraduate, Jesus College, Cambridge.
 1973–74 Graduate Student, Jesus College, Cambridge.
 1974–75 Research Student, Statistical Laboratory, Cambridge.
 1975–77 Research Fellow of Jesus College, Cambridge.
 1976–77 Calculator Development Manager, Sinclair Radionics Ltd.
 1977–78 Junior Lecturer in Statistics, Oxford University and Weir Junior Research Fellow of University College, Oxford.
 1978–80 Lecturer in Statistics, University of Bath.
 1981–84 Reader in Statistics, University of Bath.
 1984 and 1992–93 Head of Statistics Group, University of Bath.
 1984–93 Professor of Statistics, University of Bath.
 1988–91 Head of School of Mathematical Sciences, University of Bath.
 1993–2003 Professor of Statistics, University of Bristol
 1993–97 and 1998–99 Head of Statistics Group, University of Bristol
 1999–2003 Henry Overton Wills Professor of Mathematics, University of Bristol
 2000–03 Provost of the Institute for Advanced Studies, University of Bristol
 2003–09 Master of St Peter's College, Oxford
 2010–   Senior Research Fellow, Smith School of Enterprise and the Environment, Oxford (part-time)
 2010–   Professorial Research Associate, Wellcome Trust Centre for Human Genetics, Oxford (part-time)
 2010–17 Chief Scientific Advisor, Home Office
 2018–22  Professor of Modern Slavery Statistics, Rights Lab, University of Nottingham

Degrees and qualifications
 1973 Bachelor of Arts, Cambridge. (Wrangler)
 1974 Part III of Mathematical Tripos, Cambridge (with Distinction)
 1977 Doctor of Philosophy, Cambridge
 1989 Doctor of Science, Cambridge
 1993 Chartered Statistician, Royal Statistical Society
 2000 Bachelor of Theology, Southampton (First Class Honours) through STETS

Awards and honours
 1970 Gold Medal, International Mathematical Olympiad
 1974 Mayhew Prize for Mathematical Tripos Part III, University of Cambridge
 1976 Smith's Prize, Cambridge University
 1984 Royal Statistical Society Guy Medal in Bronze
 1985 Special Invited Paper, Institute of Mathematical Statistics
 1988 Technometrics Special Discussion Paper, American Statistical Association
 1991 Presidents' Award of the Committee of Presidents of Statistical Societies
 1993 Fulkerson Lecturer, Cornell University
 1995 Royal Statistical Society Guy Medal in Silver
 1997 Fellow of the Royal Society
 1999 Special Invited Paper, Institute of Mathematical Statistics
 1999 Henri Willem Methorst Medal, International Statistical Institute
 2000 Corcoran Lecturer, Oxford University
 2001 Member of Academia Europaea
 2002 Original Member, Highly Cited Researchers database, ISI
 2003 Honorary Fellow, Jesus College, Cambridge
 2018 Knight Bachelor in the 2018 New Year Honours for public service and services to Science.

Ecclesiastical career
Silverman was ordained in the Church of England as a deacon in 1999 and as a priest in 2000. From 1999 to 2005, he was an honorary assistant curate of Cotham Parish Church in the Diocese of Bristol. Between 2005 and 2009, he held Permission to Officiate in the Diocese of Oxford. Then, from 2009 to 2015, he was an honorary assistant curate of St Giles' Church and St Margaret's Church, Oxford. From 2015 to 2022, he held Permission to Officiate in both the Diocese of Oxford and in the Diocese of London.  He renounced his orders in 2022.

Books

References

Sources and links
 Bernard Silverman's CV
 Bernard Silverman home page
 
Prof Bernard Silverman, FRS at Debrett's People of Today

1952 births
Living people
Alumni of Jesus College, Cambridge
Fellows of the Royal Society
21st-century English Anglican priests
English statisticians
Fellows of University College, Oxford
Academics of the University of Bath
Academics of the University of Bristol
Masters of St Peter's College, Oxford
People educated at the City of London School
Presidents of the Institute of Mathematical Statistics
Presidents of the Royal Statistical Society
Members of Academia Europaea
Fellows of Jesus College, Cambridge 
International Mathematical Olympiad participants
Civil servants in the Home Office
Annals of Statistics editors